"Walkaway Lover" is the third single performed by Australian actress/singer Toni Pearen released in October 1994, from her debut album Intimate.

Toni Pearen's first two singles "In Your Room" and "I Want You" both peaked at number ten on the Australian singles chart and were each certified gold. "Walkaway Lover" debuted at number 50 week ending 23 October and eventually peaked at number 35 week ending 11 November 1994, spending a total of twelve weeks in the top 50, and sixteen weeks in the top 100. The single was issued to coincide with the much anticipated release of the album Intimate. Some could cite that the single's underperformance was because it was released more than one year after the successful second single "I Want You". This could also be seen as a reason the album itself also did not chart well.
The song is a cover of an album track by British singer Sonia.

Track listing
CD and cassette single

 "Walkaway Lover" — 4:19
 "Crazy For Your Love" — ?:??

Charts

References

1994 singles
Toni Pearen songs
1994 songs
Mushroom Records singles